Leslie Small (born 1968/1969) is an American film director and producer.

Career
Leslie Small began his career in 1988 shooting a commercial for Master P's No Limit Films. While working with Mo'Nique to prepare her one-woman show Mo'Nique: One Night Stand (2005), the producer also discussed producing a female comedy in the world of hair, which ended up being Small's theatrical directorial debut film Hair Show (2004). Since then he has filmed numerous films and television specials, including Kevin Hart: Laugh at My Pain (2011), Kevin Hart: Let Me Explain (2013), Kevin Hart: What Now? (2016), and Kevin Hart: Irresponsible (2019).

Personal life 
Small is from the city of Los Angeles. He has a Bachelor of Science degree in Psychology, a master's degree in Statistics, and a PhD in Economics.

Filmography

 Charlie Hustle: Blueprint of a Self-Made Millionaire (1999)
 Tara (2001)
 Cedric the Entertainer: Starting Lineup (2002)
 Bruce Bruce Live (2003)
 The Torry Brothers: A Family Affair (2004)
 Hair Show (2004)
 Black Leather Soles (2005)
 Earthquake: About Got Damm Time (2005)
 Tell Hell I Ain’t Comin’ (2005)
 Bill Bellamy: Back to My Roots (2005)
 Love on Layaway (2005)
 Mo'Nique: One Night Stand (2005)
 Steve Harvey: Don't Trip… He Ain't Through with Me Yet (2006)
 Mike Epps: Inappropriate Behavior (2006)
 Steve Harvey: Still Trippin' (2008)
 Eddie Griffin: Freedom of Speech (2008)
 A Good Man Is Hard to Find (2008)
 All Star Comedy Jam (2009)
 All Star Comedy Jam: Live from South Beach (2009)
 Shaquille O'Neal Presents: All-Star Comedy Jam – Live from Dallas (2010)
 Mike Epps Presents: Live from Club Nokia (2011)
 Aries Spears: Hollywood, Look I'm Smiling (2011)
 DeRay Davis: Power Play (2011)
 Kevin Hart: Laugh at My Pain (2011)
 Gary Owen: True Story (2012)
 Corey Holcomb: Your Way Ain't Working (2012)
 Shaquille O'Neal Presents: All Star Comedy Jam – Live from Orlando (2012)
 Kevin Hart: Let Me Explain (2013)
 Shaquille O'Neal Presents: All Star Comedy Jam – Live from Atlanta (2013)
 One Christmas (2013)
 Shaquille O'Neal Presents: All Star Comedy Jam – Live from Las Vegas (2014)
 Kevin Hart Presents: Keith Robinson – Back of the Bus Funny (2014)
 Gary Owen: I Agree with Myself (2015)
 Comedy Dynamics: Uncontrolled Comedy (2015)
 Kevin Hart: What Now? (2016)
 Shaquille O'Neal Presents: All Star Comedy Jam: Live from Sin City (2016)
 Mo Funny, Mo Laughs (2018)
 Katt Williams: Great America (2018)
 Kevin Hart: Irresponsible (2019)
 Undercover Brother 2 (2019)
 Holiday Rush (2019)
 2 Minutes of Fame (2020)
Kevin Hart: Zero F**ks Given (2020)
 Olympic Highlights with Kevin Hart and Snoop Dogg (2021 TV series)
 For the Love of Money (2021)

References

External links

African-American film directors
African-American film producers
African-American television directors
American television directors
Comedy film directors
Film directors from Los Angeles
Living people
1960s births
21st-century African-American people
20th-century African-American people